Andreas Dumrauf (29 December 1888 – 23 January 1955) was a German wrestler. He competed in the lightweight event at the 1912 Summer Olympics.

References

External links
 

1888 births
1955 deaths
People from Bamberg (district)
People from the Kingdom of Bavaria
Olympic wrestlers of Germany
Wrestlers at the 1912 Summer Olympics
German male sport wrestlers
Sportspeople from Upper Franconia